HD 70555 (w Puppis) is a class K2.5II-III (orange giant) star in the constellation Puppis. Its apparent magnitude is 4.83 and it is approximately 1,010 light years away based on parallax.

w Puppis should not to be confused with W Puppis (Uppercase, Bayer designation), or W Puppis (Uppercase, Variable star designation).

References

Puppis
K-type giants
Puppis, w
CD-32 5185
040945
3282
070555